Albert "Abb" Curtis (September 5, 1902 – July 16, 1981) was a former football and basketball player for the University of Texas at Austin.

Early life and education
Curtis was born in Ada, Oklahoma. He attended Paschal High School in Fort Worth, Texas and entered UT in the fall of 1920.

Professional career
Curtis was a letterman at defensive end for the Longhorns football team for two seasons from 1922 to 1923 and at guard for the basketball team for three seasons from 1922 to 1924. In his senior year, Curtis played on first-year football and basketball head coach E. J. "Doc" Stewart's undefeated football (8–0–1) and undefeated Southwest Conference champion basketball (23–0) teams. The 1924 Longhorn basketball team received a retroactive national ranking of No. 3 in the Premo-Porretta Power Poll. Curtis received All-Southwest Conference honors in basketball following his senior season; he was also recognized as a consensus first-team All-American in basketball—one of only seven Longhorn men's basketball players ever to receive that honor, as of 2015.

Curtis would serve as the supervisor of officiating for the Southwest Conference from 1950 to 1967. He was inducted into the UT Athletics Men's Hall of Honor in 1969.

References

External links
Profile at Real GM

1902 births
1981 deaths
All-American college men's basketball players
American men's basketball players
Basketball players from Oklahoma
Guards (basketball)
People from Ada, Oklahoma
Players of American football from Oklahoma
Texas Longhorns football players
Texas Longhorns men's basketball players